Mish Mash! is the fifth studio album from Australian rock band, Regurgitator. Mish Mash! was released on 15 November 2004 and peaked at number 52 on the ARIA Charts.

The band's drummer, Peter Kostic, told The Age the band had wanted to dig deep to find the inspiration for the album saying; "It was really positive. It enabled us to block out everything else that was happening and focus on recording. We worked really quickly as a result. I don't think this would have been as good a record had we not done this."
 
Speaking in 2005, Kostic said "I'm really happy with the record, if I had gone through all that and in the end come out with a record that I wasn't personally pleased with, I would be pretty distraught."

Background and release
The album was the result of the Band in a Bubble project, a new reality TV-inspired media stunt sponsored and broadcast by Australian music channel, Channel V. The band entered a small glass recording studio, built in Federation Square in the centre of Melbourne, to record the album. Pedestrians could look into most rooms of the "bubble" and could watch the band work, or tune into a 24-hour digital cable television channel and watch the band work. Nobody could enter or leave the bubble. In addition to the three band members, Australian producer Magoo, engineer Hugh and Channel V host Jabba were all also locked into the bubble with the band.

Yeomans later explained, "It was based on the idea of Big Brother but also doing something creative in the space. When I was living in London I'd seen David Blaine sitting in a bubble just doing nothing and Paul [Curtis, manager] had talked about doing it a long time ago. We just kinda woke up with, like, crowds of people staring at us in our underpants and stuff - it was super surreal."

The album was issued on vinyl by Valve in October 2013.

Track listing
 "The Drop" – 3:06
 "My Friend Robot" – 2:58
 "I, Zombie" – 3:16
 "Shopping Mall Soul" – 2:47
 "The Game" – 4:15
 "My Computer Crashed" – 2:22
 "Metal is Big in the Baltic States" – 2:12
 "Sonnet of a Media Mogul" – 4:05
 "My Ego" – 3:20
 "Don't Go 2 Sleep" – 2:13
 "Mish Mash!" – 1:06
 "I'm Sensible" – 2:38
 "If This is the Blues, Why Do I Feel So Green?" – 3:43
 "I Was Sent by God to Get You Off" – 5:15
 "Rap For Kids" (hidden track) - 6:17

Following the end of I Was Sent by God to Get You Off, there is one minute of silence before "Rap For Kids" plays; album pressings list I Was Sent by God to Get You Off as 12:32.

Charts

Release history

References

Regurgitator albums
2004 albums